Charles Best (1570–1627) was an English poet.

Best was a contributor to Francis Davison's Poetical Rapsodie (1608). The first edition of that anthology contains two pieces by Best, A Sonnet of the Sun (eighteen lines) and A Sonnet of the Moon.

In the third edition (1611) Best contributed An Epitaph on Henry Fourth, the last French King, An Epitaph on Queen Elizabeth, Union's Jewell, 'A Panegyrick to my Sovereign Lord the King,' and a few other pieces.

References
Davison's Poetical Rhapsody, ed. Nicholas Harris Nicolas, 1826.
Attribution

External links

A Sonnet of the Moon

1570 births
1627 deaths
Sonneteers
17th-century English poets
17th-century English male writers
17th-century English writers
English male poets